According to traditional Chinese uranography, the modern constellation  Canes Venatici is located in Three Enclosures (三垣, Sān Yuán)

The name of the western constellation in modern Chinese is 獵犬座 (liè quǎn zuò), meaning "the hound constellation".

Stars

See also
Traditional Chinese star names
Chinese constellations

References

External links
Canes Venatici – Chinese associations
 香港太空館研究資源
 中國星區、星官及星名英譯表
 天象文學
 台灣自然科學博物館天文教育資訊網
 中國古天文
 中國古代的星象系統

Astronomy in China
Canes Venatici